Another Round may refer to:

 Another Round, a 2002 album by The Irish Rovers
 Another Round (album), a 2010 album by Jaheim, or the title song
 Another Round (film), a 2020 Danish film
 "Another Round" (Fat Joe song), 2011
 Another Round (group), a collegiate a cappella group
 Another Round (podcast), a Buzzfeed podcast hosted by Tracy Clayton and Heben Nigatu